Darian King and Peter Polansky were the defending champions but chose not to defend their title.

Billy Harris and Kelsey Stevenson won the title after defeating Max Schnur and John-Patrick Smith 2–6, 7–6(11–9), [10–8] in the final.

Seeds

Draw

References

External links
 Main draw

Winnipeg National Bank Challenger - Doubles
2022 Doubles